Oregon Route 370 (OR 370) is an Oregon state highway running from US 97 near Redmond to OR 126 in Prineville. OR 370 is known as the O'Neil Highway No. 370 (see Oregon highways and routes).

OR 370 was established in 2002 as part of Oregon's project to assign route numbers to highways that previously were not assigned, and, as of July 2021, was unsigned.

Route description 

History 

OR 370 was assigned to the O'Neil Highway in 2002.

Major intersections

References 

 Oregon Department of Transportation, Descriptions of US and Oregon Routes, https://web.archive.org/web/20051102084300/http://www.oregon.gov/ODOT/HWY/TRAFFIC/TEOS_Publications/PDF/Descriptions_of_US_and_Oregon_Routes.pdf, page 30.
 Oregon Department of Transportation, The Dalles-California Highway No. 4, ftp://ftp.odot.state.or.us/tdb/trandata/maps/slchart_pdfs_1980_to_2002/Hwy004_1999.pdf

370
Transportation in Deschutes County, Oregon
Transportation in Crook County, Oregon